The Central West is a region of New South Wales, Australia. The region is geographically in central and eastern New South Wales, in the area west of the Blue Mountains, which are west of Sydney. The region also includes the sub-region known as the Central Tablelands, located in the eastern part of the region. The region known as the Orana, which includes the area surrounding Dubbo is commonly classed as being a part of the Central West also.

Major population and service centres in the Central West include Bathurst, Cowra, Lithgow, Mudgee, Orange, and Parkes. Bathurst and Orange are home to campuses of Charles Sturt University, and Lithgow housing the University of Notre Dame Regional Clinical School.

Cities and towns 
The Central West includes the large regional centres of Bathurst and Orange; the towns of Cowra, Mudgee, Lithgow and Parkes; and smaller centres, such as Blayney, Canowindra, Condobolin, Eugowra, Forbes, Grenfell, Gulgong, Kandos, Lake Cargelligo, Millthorpe,  Molong, Oberon, Peak Hill, Portland, Rylstone, and Wallerawang.

Demography and area
The following local government areas are contained within the region:

Terrain 
The Central West's east is higher, wetter and hillier and supports orchards, vineyards, vegetable-growing and pastoralism. The west is flatter and drier and supports grain crops and pastoralism.

Major highways 
The Central West region is traversed by the Great Western Highway, the Mid-Western Highway, the Mitchell Highway, the Newell Highway and the Castlereagh Highway.

Media 
The Central West has several radio stations, including 2BS 95.1FM, B-Rock FM, Life Radio AM 1629khz, 97.9 2LVR (a community radio station), 105.1 2GZFM, 105.9 Star FM, Radio 2LT, 107.9 Move FM, 95.5 ROK FM, 107.5 Community Radio, 103.5 Rhema FM and 1089AM — a commercial station that gets most of its programming from 2SM in Sydney. Other electronic media are represented by the Australian Broadcasting Corporation with both television and radio broadcasting; and by television stations Prime7, Nine, and Southern Cross 10.

Two major newspapers are published in the region, the Central Western Daily newspaper is published in Orange and the Western Advocate in Bathurst. Numerous other local papers serve the remaining large towns.

History 
The Central West area was originally inhabited by the Wiradjuri people. The first British explorer, George Wilson Evans, entered the Lachlan Valley in 1815. He named the area the Oxley Plains after his superior the surveyor-general, John Oxley. In 1817 he deemed the area unfit for settlement. A Military Depot was established not long after at Soldiers Flat near present-day Billimari. Arthur Ranken and James Sloan, from Bathurst, were amongst the first European settlers on the Lachlan. They moved to the area in 1831.

In the 1850s many gold prospectors passed through headed for gold fields at Lambing Flat (Young) and Grenfell.

References

External links

 NSW Forecast Areas map
 Department of Local Government page for the region listing links to council pages
 "Open Directory" listing

 
Regions of New South Wales
Newell Highway